José Manuel Rodríguez Ibáñez (born 20 May 1966) is a paralympic athlete from Spain competing mainly in category F11 long and triple jump events.

Jose Manuel was part of the Spanish Paralympics every games from 1984 Summer Paralympics to 2004 Summer Paralympics winning medals at five of the games.  His first medal came in 1984 when he won a silver medal in the triple jump as well as competing in the B1 category high jump.  The following games led to a bronze medal in his only event, the B1 triple jump.  The 1992 Summer Paralympics led to more medals a bronze in the 100m and his first gold medal in the triple jump as well as competing in the long jump.  In the 1996 Summer Paralympics he again competed in the long and triple jump and won the gold medal in both as well as a silver in the 100m.  Sydney hosted the 2000 Summer Paralympics which were to be Jose's fifth games leading to a third consecutive gold medal in the triple jump, a silver in the long jump as well as competing in the 100m.  Jose's last games in 2004 were some what of a disappointment as despite competing in the long jump and triple jump he failed to win any further medals.

Notes

References

External links 
 
 

1966 births
Living people
Spanish male sprinters
Spanish male long jumpers
Spanish male high jumpers
Spanish male triple jumpers
Paralympic athletes of Spain
Paralympic gold medalists for Spain
Paralympic silver medalists for Spain
Paralympic bronze medalists for Spain
Athletes (track and field) at the 1984 Summer Paralympics
Athletes (track and field) at the 1988 Summer Paralympics
Athletes (track and field) at the 1992 Summer Paralympics
Athletes (track and field) at the 1996 Summer Paralympics
Athletes (track and field) at the 2000 Summer Paralympics
Athletes (track and field) at the 2004 Summer Paralympics
Medalists at the 1984 Summer Paralympics
Medalists at the 1988 Summer Paralympics
Medalists at the 1992 Summer Paralympics
Medalists at the 1996 Summer Paralympics
Medalists at the 2000 Summer Paralympics
Paralympic medalists in athletics (track and field)
Visually impaired sprinters
Visually impaired long jumpers
Visually impaired high jumpers
Visually impaired triple jumpers
Paralympic sprinters
Paralympic long jumpers
Paralympic high jumpers
Paralympic triple jumpers